Billy Murray was an English footballer, who played as a wing half in the Football League for Manchester City.

References

1922 births
1992 deaths
Footballers from Burnley
English footballers
Association football wing halves
Arbroath F.C. players
Manchester City F.C. players
Macclesfield Town F.C. players
Scottish Football League players
English Football League players